Velvarai  is a village in the  
Avadaiyarkoilrevenue block of Pudukkottai district, Tamil Nadu, India.

Demographics 

As per the 2001 census, Velvarai had a total population of 431 with 192 males and 239 females. Out of the total population 252 people were literate.

References

Villages in Pudukkottai district